Zakarias Tormóðsson (died 1628) was Lawman of the Faroe Islands from 1608 to 1628.

References

Løgtingið 150 - Hátíðarrit. Tórshavn 2002, Bind 2, S. 366. (Avsnitt Føroya løgmenn fram til 1816) (PDF-Download)

Lawmen of the Faroe Islands
1628 deaths
Year of birth unknown